The 1985 President's Cup Football Tournament was the 15th competition of Korea Cup. The competition was held from 1 to 8 June 1985, and was won by South Korea for the ninth time, who defeated South Korea B in the final. It attracted a total of 176,000 spectators.

First group stage

Group A

Group B

Group C

Group D

Second group stage

Group A

Group B

Knockout stage

Bracket

Semi-finals

Third place match

Final

See also
Korea Cup
South Korea national football team results

References

External links
President's Cup 1985 (South Korea) at RSSSF
1985 Bangu season at oGol 

1985
1985 in South Korean football